Zhang Xun (September 16, 1854 – September 11, 1923), courtesy name Shaoxuan, art name Songshoulaoren, nickname Bianshuai, was a Chinese general and Qing loyalist who attempted to restore the abdicated emperor Puyi in the Manchu Restoration of 1917. He also supported Yuan Shikai during his time as president.

Biography
He was born on September 16, 1854, in Chitian village, Fengxin county, Jiangxi.

Zhang served as a military escort for Empress Dowager Cixi during the Boxer Uprising. He later served as a subordinate of General Yuan Shikai in the Beiyang Army. He fought for the Qing at Nanjing in 1911, and then after the fall of the Qing, he remained loyal to Yuan Shikai. Despite serving as a general in the new Republic, he refused to cut his queue, as a symbol of his loyalty to the Qing. He was called the "Queue General". He seized Nanjing from the KMT in 1913, defeating the Second Revolution.  Despite allowing his troops to savagely loot the city, Zhang was named a field marshal by Yuan.

Between 1 July 1917 and 12 July 1917, Zhang Xun proclaimed himself Prime Minister of the Imperial Cabinet by entering Beijing to reinstate the deposed Puyi as Emperor of the Qing dynasty. However, Zhang Xun's proclamation in July 1917 was never recognized by the Government of the Chinese Republic, most of the Chinese people, or any foreign countries. Other generals loyal to the Republic subsequently thwarted Zhang and forced Puyi to abdicate again. Zhang then took refuge in the Dutch legation and never participated in politics again.

He died on September 11, 1923.

Notes

References

1854 births
1923 deaths
Chinese monarchists
Politicians from Yichun, Jiangxi
Republic of China politicians from Jiangxi
Qing dynasty generals
Generals from Jiangxi
Viceroys of Liangjiang
Empire of China (1915–1916)